Omar Daher Gadid (born 1 January 1966) is a Djiboutian long-distance athlete.

Gadid has competed at two Olympics, firstly at the 1992 Summer Olympics in Barcelona when he entered the 10,000 metres where he came in 25th in his heat so didn't qualify for the final, eight years later at the 2000 Summer Olympics in Sydney he entered the marathon where he failed to finish the race.

References

1966 births
Living people
Athletes (track and field) at the 1992 Summer Olympics
Athletes (track and field) at the 2000 Summer Olympics
Olympic athletes of Djibouti
Djiboutian male marathon runners
Djiboutian male long-distance runners